Shurcheh (also Romanized as Shūrcheh; also known as Shoocheh) is a village in Nivan Rural District, in the Central District of Golpayegan County, Isfahan Province, Iran. At the 2006 census, its population was 148, in 46 families.

References 

Populated places in Golpayegan County